That Man in Istanbul is a 1965 English-language European international co-production adventure film directed by Antonio Isasi-Isasmendi and starring Horst Buchholz. It was released in the United States by Columbia Pictures. That Man in Istanbul is a eurospy comedy film. Its English-language title is likely a reference to the 1964 eurospy comedy film That Man from Rio.

Plot
After paying a million dollars ransom in used notes for a nuclear scientist abducted in Turkey, the CIA find that they were fobbed off with a double. Refusing to accept defeat, agent Kelly goes on holiday to Istanbul where she meets nightclub owner Tony, who knows all the local underworld. He is excited by the idea of retrieving the million dollars if he can find the scientist and sets to work. Despite losing Kelly, who is also abducted, after many daring adventures and dramatic fights with every possible weapon he eventually ends up on a yacht that holds the scientist, the girl, and the attaché case with the money. Giving the man back to the Americans, he keeps the other two.

Cast

References

External links

1965 films
1960s adventure comedy films
West German films
Spanish spy comedy films
Italian spy comedy films
French spy comedy films
German spy comedy films
Spanish adventure comedy films
Italian adventure comedy films
French adventure comedy films
German adventure comedy films
1960s spy comedy films
Cold War films
Columbia Pictures films
Films directed by Antonio Isasi-Isasmendi
Films set in Istanbul
English-language French films
English-language German films
English-language Italian films
English-language Spanish films
1965 comedy films
1960s English-language films
1960s Italian films
1960s French films
1960s German films